Baby One More Time may refer to:

 ...Baby One More Time (album), a 1999 debut album by Britney Spears
 "...Baby One More Time" (song), a 1998 song by Britney Spears, title track of the album
 ...Baby One More Time Tour, a 1999 North American tour by Britney Spears

See also
 Hit Me, Baby, One More Time (TV series), a 2005 television entertainment show